Küssnacht am Rigi landing stage is a landing stage in the municipality of Küssnacht, in the Swiss canton of Schwyz. It is located at the northeast corner of Lake Lucerne and is served by the Lake Lucerne Navigation Company.

Services 
 the following services stop at Küssnacht am Rigi:

 Lake Lucerne Navigation Company: during the summer months, three round-trips per day to Luzern Bahnhofquai.

References

External links 
 
 
 Küssnacht Round-Trip

Ferry terminals in Switzerland
Transport in the canton of Schwyz